The Agriculture Risk Protection Act of 2000 made major revisions to the United States' federal crop insurance program and provided emergency agricultural assistance. The crop insurance provisions significantly increased the program's government subsidy; improved coverage for farmers affected by multiple years of natural disasters; and authorized pilot insurance programs for livestock farmers and growers of other farm commodities that were not served by crop insurance, among many other provisions. The emergency provisions made available a total of $7.14 billion in emergency farm assistance, mostly in direct payments (called market loss payments) to growers of various commodities to compensate for low farm commodity prices.

See also
 Agricultural Management Assistance Program

References 

United States Department of Agriculture
United States federal agriculture legislation
Agricultural insurance in the United States
Acts of the 106th United States Congress